is a professional Go player.

Hane was one of the best players in the Nagoya branch of the Nihon Ki-in during his peak. He is probably better known for being the father of the former Kisei holder, Naoki Hane. He was also known as a major contributor in the development of Chinese fuseki. He was taught Go by Shimamura Toshihiro, and currently teaches his son, Naoki, along with Asano Yasuko and Kaori Aoba.

Titles & runners-up

References

1944 births
Japanese Go players
Living people
Sportspeople from Mie Prefecture